Casey FitzSimmons (born October 10, 1980) is a former National Football League (NFL) tight end. He played his whole career for the Detroit Lions.

High school years
FitzSimmons attended Chester High School in Chester, Montana and was an All-Conference, and an All-State honoree. He played four positions—wide receiver, tight end, defensive end and linebacker. The high school he attended was so small that the football team played eight-man football. Prior to his junior year in high school, he was injured in a motorbike accident and missed the season. He was close to not playing his senior year, but was talked into it by some friends.

College years
FitzSimmons attended Carroll College. He finished his college career with 244 receptions for 2,698 yards and 21 touchdowns. His 2001 totals included 78 receptions for 812 yards and five touchdowns and his 2000 totals included 70 catches for 686 yards and eight touchdowns. Also in 2000 and 2001, he earned second-team NAIA All-American honors and was a first-team All-Conference selection all four seasons at Carroll College (Mont.).  He led the Fighting Saints to the 2002 NAIA National Championship with a 28-7 win over the two-time defending NAIA Champion Georgetown (Ky.). During his senior championship run, earned first-team All-American honors and was named the Frontier Conference MVP and finalist for NAIA Player of the Year Award while catching 79 passes for 971 yards and six touchdowns.

Professional career
FitzSimmons was undrafted in 2003. He then signed with the Detroit Lions. He returned a kickoff for a touchdown to seal the Lions' win over the Chicago Bears on September 30, 2007.
On April 14, 2010 FitzSimmons retired from the National Football League.

Stats

References

1980 births
Living people
American football tight ends
Carroll Fighting Saints football players
Detroit Lions players
People from Wolf Point, Montana
People from Chester, Montana